Lot 37 is a township in Queens County, Prince Edward Island, Canada.  It is part of Bedford Parish. Lot 37 was awarded to William Spry and James Barker in the 1767 land lottery.

References

37
Geography of Queens County, Prince Edward Island